The , abbreviated MLIT, is a ministry of the Japanese government. It is responsible for one-third of all the laws and orders in Japan, and is the largest Japanese ministry in terms of employees, as well as the second-largest executive agency of the Japanese government after the Ministry of Defense. The ministry oversees four external agencies including the Japan Coast Guard and the Japan Tourism Agency.

Overview
In order to accomplish the tasks set forth in Article 3 of the Ministry of Land, Infrastructure, Transport and Tourism Act, the following should be considered: national land planning, cities, roads, buildings, houses, rivers, ports, government maintenance, national land surveying, transportation, tourism policy, meteorological services It is responsible for matters related to national land, transportation, and social capital development, such as disaster countermeasures, security of the surrounding sea area, and security.

Initially, the English notation was Ministry of Land, Infrastructure and Transport (land land, infrastructure construction, infrastructure, transport, transportation), but when the Tourism Agency was established on January 8, 2008, it means “tourism”. And added it to the Ministry of Land, Infrastructure, Transport and Tourism.

Background
Before the ministry renamed itself on January 8, 2008, the ministry's English name was "Ministry of Land, Infrastructure and Transport".

On October 1, 2008, the Japan Tourism Agency was newly established, the Marine Accident Inquiry Agency was involved in investigating the causes of accidents, and the Aviation and Railway Accident Investigation Committee was integrated to establish a Transport Safety Committee and the Seafarers' Labor Committee was abolished. An organizational change was implemented to transfer the work of this committee to the Central Labor Commission and the Transport Policy Council. This is the first time a new ministry has been established in the central ministry since the so-called central ministry reorganization.

On July 1, 2011, the bureau was reorganized to establish a cross-provincial system and to unify related administrations.To unify water-related administrations, the River Bureau and the Land and Water Resources Bureau Reorganize the Ministry of Resources and the Sewerage Department of the Urban and Regional Development Bureau, and reorganize the Land Management Department of the Land and Water Resources Department and the Construction Industry Administration Department of the General Policy Department into the “Water Management and Land Conservation Department”. The Land and Construction Industry Bureau reorganized the National Land Planning Bureau and the Urban and Regional Development Bureau into the National Land Policy Bureau and the Urban Bureau, respectively.

Organization

MLIT is organized into the following bureaus:

External agencies
Japan Coast Guard
Japan Meteorological Agency
Japan Tourism Agency
Japan Transport Safety Board
 (former)

Financial resources
The budget under the Ministry of Land, Infrastructure, Transport and Tourism in the initial budget for the general account in FY2019 (FY2018) is ¥ 7.2223 trillion. By organization, the Ministry of Land, Infrastructure, Transport and Tourism (METI) accounts for about 92% of the total, amounting to ¥ 6,333,533,790,000 yen. ¥ 159,34,000, Marine Accident Tribunal: ¥ 96,9826,000, Regional Development Bureau: ¥ 244,0812,14,000, Hokkaido Development Bureau: ¥ 54,382,933,000, Local Transportation Bureau: ¥ 21,678.43 million 9,000 yen, Regional Aviation Bureau 2,184,614,000 yen, Tourism Agency 68,325,4,000 yen, Japan Meteorological Agency 60,646,25,000 yen, Transportation Safety Commission 2,142,697,000 yen, The Japan Coast Guard has a price of 21,753,537,000 yen.

The revenue budget is 81,445,570,000 yen. Breakdown by subject shows that government property reconciliation income is 70,422,400,000 yen and miscellaneous income is 744,033,309,000 yen. Most of the revenue from government asset reconciliation is proceeds from collections (repayment of loans for public works (70,286,627,000 yen)) Most of miscellaneous income is from public works expenses (for public works). This is the responsibility of the local government (58,583,382,800 yen).

The Ministry of Land, Infrastructure, Transport and Tourism will be responsible for the Special Account for Vehicle Safety and will cooperate with the Ministry of Finance on FILP. Also, the Diet, courts, the Board of Audit, the Cabinet, Cabinet Office, Reconstruction Agency, Ministry of Internal Affairs and Communications, Ministry of Justice, Ministry of Foreign Affairs, Ministry of Finance, Ministry of Education, Culture, Sports, Science and Technology, Ministry of Health, Labor and Welfare, Ministry of Agriculture, Forestry and Fisheries, Ministry of Economy, Trade and Industry, Ministry of Land, Infrastructure, Transport and Tourism, Ministry of Environment Under the jurisdiction of the Ministry of Defense, cooperate with the Great East Japan Earthquake Recovery Special Account. The special account for automobile safety includes an airport maintenance account as a running account.

Public relations
The White Papers compiled by the Ministry of Land, Infrastructure, Transport and Tourism include the "Ministry of Land and Transportation White Paper", "Land White Paper", "Tourism White Paper", "Japan Water Resources", "Capital Circle White Paper", "Current Meteorological Business" (commonly known as the Meteorological White Paper) and "Marine Security Seven types of reports "(formerly known as the White Paper on Maritime Security). Among them, "Land White Paper", "Tourism White Paper", and "Capital Circle White Paper" are included in the annual government proposal to the Congress in accordance with Article 10 of the Basic Land Law, Article 8 of the Basic Law on Promoting the Establishment of the State and Article 30-2 of the Capital City Development Act. Report or policy document.

The Ministry of Land, Infrastructure, Transport and Tourism's monthly magazine "Land and Land Transportation" consists of 4 groups: "Corporate Transportation Promotion Association", "Social Corporation Construction Public Relations Association", "Consortium Land Planning Association", "Hokkaido Development Association" Co-published, then closed in March 2009 issue. The main body of editing and distribution was changed to the Ministry of Land, Infrastructure, Transport and Tourism in December 2009 in the form of a bimonthly publication.

References

External links

 
 Official website 
 

 
2001 establishments in Japan
L
Japan
Ministries established in 2001
Japan
Japan
Japan
Transport organizations based in Japan